Yam is a rural locality (a village) in Krasnoplamenskoye Rural Settlement, Alexandrovsky District, Vladimir Oblast, Russia. The population was 15 as of 2010. There is 1 street.

Geography 
The village is located 12 km north from Krasnoye Plamya, 37 km north-west from Alexandrov.

References 

Rural localities in Alexandrovsky District, Vladimir Oblast